ThunderTalk Gaming (commonly shortened to TT Gaming or TT) is a professional League of Legends team competing in the League of Legends Pro League (LPL), the top level of professional League of Legends in China.

It was founded on 25 December 2017 as SinoDragon Gaming (SDG) and was one of two teams (the other being Victory Five) accepted into the LPL as part of the league's 2019 expansion. The team rebranded as Dominus Esports (DMO) on 22 May 2019, and again on 15 September 2020 after its acquisition by Chinese messaging service ThunderTalk.

History 

SinoDragon Gaming was accepted into the LPL on 30 November 2018. Prior to their entry into the LPL, the team competed in the League of Legends Developmental League (LDL), China's secondary league. The team's inaugural LPL roster consisted of top laners Jiang "Changhong" Changhong and Yang "Memory" Jubao, jungler Wang "Xiaopeng" Peng, mid laner Huang "Twila" Tingwei, bot laner Chen "GALA" Wei, and support Ling "Mark" Xu, with Ouyang "Iceman" Yiqiang as head coach. The team finished 6th in the 2019 LPL Spring Split with a 9–6 record, qualifying them for playoffs, where they defeated Edward Gaming 3–0 in the first round and lost to Topsports Gaming 0–3 in the quarterfinals.

Roster

Tournament results

References

External links 
 

2017 establishments in China
Esports teams established in 2017
Esports teams based in China
League of Legends Pro League teams